None of the above is an option on some ballots that allows voters the opportunity to express disapproval of all candidates.

None of the above may also refer to:

Politics
 None of the above (India), a voting option in India
 None of the Above Direct Democracy Party, a minor provincial political party in Ontario, Canada
 None Of The Above X, name used by the boxer Terry Marsh as a candidate in South Basildon and East Thurrock in the 2010 UK General Election
 Zero, None Of The Above, a candidate in Filton and Bradley Stoke in the 2010 UK General Election

Arts and entertainment
 None of the Above (novel), by I. W. Gregorio, 2015
 None of the Above renamed Street Genius, a National Geographic Channel popular science show, 2013-2014
 "None of the Above" (Dawson's Creek), an episode of Dawson's Creek
 Because I Love It, an album by Amerie, originally planned to be titled None of the Above
 None of the Above (album), a 2000 album by Peter Hammill
 "None of the Above", a song by Duran Duran from Duran Duran, 1993
 "None of the Above", a song by Papa Roach from Crooked Teeth, 2017

See also 
 Above Znoneofthe